Vanden Stock is a surname. Notable people with the surname include:

Constant Vanden Stock (1914–2008), Belgian footballer and manager
Constant Vanden Stock Stadium, football stadium in Brussels, Belgium
Roger Vanden Stock (born 1942), Belgian footballer